This is a list of schools in Johor, Malaysia.It is categorised according to the variants of schools in Malaysia, and is arranged alphabetically.

Primary schools

National primary schools
 SK Ngee Heng, Johor Bahru
 SK Kota Dalam, Batu Pahat
 SK (P) Sultan Ibrahim, Johor Bahru
 SK Taman Sri Amar, Johor Bahru
 SK Majiidee Baru, Johor Bahru
 SK Convent, Batu Pahat, Johor
 SK Parit Bilal, Batu Pahat
 SK Ayer Hitam, Batu Pahat
 SK Ayer Molek, Johor Bahru
 SK Bakri Batu 2, Muar,
 SK Bandar Maharani, Muar
 SK Belokok, Pontian
 SK Bandar Uda (2)
 SK Bukit Kangkar, Ledang
 SK Bandar Seri Alam
 SK Canossian Convent, Kluang
 SK Convent, Muar
 SK Dumpar, Muar
 SK Ismail 1, Muar
 SK Ismail 2, Muar
 SK Jalan Yusof, Muar
 SK Jementah, Segamat
 SK Kopok, Pasir Gudang
 SK Kompleks UDA, Johor Bahru
 SK Kempas, Johor Bahru
 SK Kota Masai
 SK Laksamana, Kota Tinggi
 SK Larkin 1, Johor Bahru
 SK Larkin 2, Johor Bahru
 SK Nitar 2, Mersing
 SK Nusantara, Gelang Patah, Iskandar Puteri.
 SK Parit Hj. Adnan, Pontian
 SK Parit Kadir, Batu Pahat
 SK Parit Kemang, Batu Pahat
 SK Parit Raja, Batu Pahat
 SK Parit Sulaiman, Telok Kerang, Pontian
 SK Pasir Gudang (1)
 SK Pasir Gudang (2)
 SK Pasir Gudang (3)
 SK Pasir Gudang (4)
 SK Pasir Puteh
 SK Pintas Puding, Parit Raja, Batu Pahat
 SK Saint Andrew, Muar
 SK Seri Idaman, Batu Pahat
 SK Senggarang, Batu Pahat
 SK Seri Alam 2, Johor Bahru
 SK Seri Mulia, Rengit, Batu Pahat
 SK Seri Puleh, Batu Pahat
 SK Seri Tangkak, Tangkak
 SK Seri Timbul, Batu Pahat
 SK Seri Anom, Sanglang, Pontian
 SK Simpang Jeram, Muar
 SK Serkat, Pontian
 SK Sungai Boh, Pontian
 SK Sungai Bunyi, Pontian
 SK Sri Mersing
 SK Sri Sabak Uni, Parit Raja, Batu Pahat
 SK Sri Skudai
 SK St Joseph, Johor Bahru
 SK Sultan Sir Ibrahim, Kluang
 SK Sungai Abong, Muar
 SK Taman Bukit Tiram
 SK Taman Mutiara Rini 2, Skudai
 SK Taman Pasir Putih
 SK Tanjung Puteri Resort
 SK Taman Cendana
 SK Taman Johor Jaya 1
 SK Taman Johor Jaya 2
 SK Taman Johor Jaya 3
 SK Taman Johor Jaya 4
 SK Taman Johor Jaya 5
 SK Taman Rinting 1
 SK Taman Rinting 2
 SK Taman Rinting 3
 SK Perigi Acheh
 SK Taman Impian Emas
 SK Kopok
 SK Cahaya Baru
 SK Taman Bukit Indah, Iskandar Puteri
 SK Taman Perling, Johor Bahru
 SK Taman Sri Pulai, Johor Bahru
 SK Taman Sri Saujana, Kota Tinggi
 SK Taman Universiti (1), Skudai
 SK Taman Universiti (2), Skudai
 SK Taman Universiti (3), Skudai
 SK Taman Universiti (4), Skudai
 Sk Tanjung Puteri
 SK Temenggong Abdul Rahman I (STAR 1), Johor Bahru
 SK Temenggong Abdul Rahman II (STAR 2), Johor Bahru
 SK Temenggong Abdul Rahman, Segamat
 SK Temenggong Ibrahim Penggaram (SKTIP), Batu Pahat
 SK Tenglu Mersing
 SK Ulu Tiram
 SK Pengkalan Rinting, Johor Bahru
 SK Sungai Durian, Pontian
 SK Taman Kota Jaya
 SK Kg Melayu, Kluang
 SK Bandar (Lelaki), Kluang
 Sk Bandar (Perempuan), Kluang
 SK Taman Desa Jaya, Johor Bahru
 SK Masai
 SK Parit Bakar Darat Muar
 SK Taman Molek
 SK Kulai
 SK Kulai 1
 SK Taman Indahpura 1
 SK Taman Indahpura 2
 SK Taman Tampoi Utama
 SK Taman Daya 3
 SK Taman Daya 2

Chinese-type primary schools
 SJK (C) Ai Chun, Segamat
 SJK (C) Ai Chun (1), Batu Pahat
 SJK (C) Ai Chun (2), Batu Pahat
 SJK (C) Ai Hwa, Panchor, Muar
 SJK (C) Aik Ming, Bukit Pasir, Muar
 SJK (C) Ban Foo, Ulu Tiram
 SJK (C) Batu, Kulai
 SJK (C) Bekoh, Tangkak
 SJK (C) Bekok, Segamat
 SJK (C) Bemban, Kulai
 SJK (C) Bin Chong, Pontian
 SJK (C) Boon Lim, Parit Bulat, Muar
 SJK (C) Bukit Siput, Segamat
 SJK (C) Buloh, Batu Pahat
 SJK (C) Central Paloh
 SJK (C) Central Site
 SJK (C) Chaah
 SJK (C) Chee Tong, Masai
 SJK (C) Cheng Siu (1), Batu Pahat
 SJK (C) Cheng Siu (2), Batu Pahat
 SJK (C) Cheow Min, Pontian
 SJK (C) Chern Hwa Bukit Pasir, Batu Pahat
 SJK (C) Chin Kwang HwaYu, Parit Jawa, Muar
 SJK (C) Chien Hwa, Kampung Jawa, Pontian
 SJK (C) Chi Chih, Pontian
 SJK (C) Chi Mang, Pontian
 SJK (C) Chi Ming 1, Tangkak
 SJK (C) Chi Ming 2, Tangkak
 SJK (C) Chian Bee, Chamek
 SJK (C) Chiao Ching, Mersing
 SJK (C) Chien Chi, Plentong, Masai
 SJK (C) Chien Hwa, Pontian
 SJK (C) Chin Chiang, Renggam
 SJK (C) Chin Terh, Bakri, Muar
 SJK (C) Ching Yeh, Kulai, Johor Bahru
 SJK (C) Chong Eng, Kluang
SJK(C) Chong Hwa (1), Kluang
SJK(C) Chong Hwa (2), Kluang
SJK(C) Chong Hwa (3), Kluang
 SJK (C) Chong Hwa Kangkar Senangar, Batu Pahat
 SJK (C) Chong Hwa PT Kadir, Batu Pahat
 SJK (C) Chong Hwa Rengit, Batu Pahat
 SJK (C) Chong Hwa Segenting, Batu Pahat
 SJK (C) Chong Hwa Senggarang, Batu Pahat
 SJK (C) Chong Hwa SG. Ayam, Batu Pahat
 SJK (C) Chong Hwa Sri Gading, Batu Pahat
 SJK (C) Chong Hwa Sri Medan, Batu Pahat
 SJK (C) Chung Cheng, Batu Pahat
 SJK (C) Chung Hwa, Pontian
 SJK (C) Chung Hwa 1A & 1B, Muar
 SJK (C) Chung Hwa 2A & 2B, Muar
 SJK (C) Chung Hwa 3, Muar
 SJK (C) Chung Hwa Jorak, Muar
 SJK (C) Chung Hwa Presbyterian, Muar
 SJK (C) Foon Yew 1, Johor Bahru
 SJK (C) Foon Yew 2, Johor Bahru
 SJK (C) Foon Yew 3, Johor Bahru
 SJK (C) Foon Yew 4, Johor Bahru
 SJK (C) Foon Yew 5, Johor Bahru
 SJK (C) Gau San, Pontian
 SJK (C) Gogok, Pengerang
 SJK (C) Hua Min, Batu Pahat
 SJK (C) Hwa Jin, Batu Pahat
 SJK (C) Hwa Nan (华南国民型华文小学), Batu Pahat
 SJK (C) Hwa Nan, Segamat
 SJK (C) Jabi, Segamat
 SJK (C) Jagoh, Segamat
 SJK (C) Jemaluang, Mersing
 SJK (C) Jementah 1, Segamat
 SJK (C) Jementah 2, Segamat
 SJK (C) Johor Jaya
 SJK (C) Kahang, Kluang
 SJK (C) Kampung Tengah, Segamat
 SJK (C) Kangkar Bahru, Batu Pahat
 SJK (C) Karas, Segamat
 SJK (C) Kasap, Segamat
 SJK (C) Kempas Baru, Johor Bahru
 SJK (C) Ken Boon, Pontian
 SJK (C) Kepong, Bukit Kepong, Muar
 SJK (C) Kg. Gajah Kluang
 SJK (C) Kg. Hubong, Mersing
 SJK (C) Kim Kee
 SJK (C) Kong Nan, Parit Raja, Batu Pahat
 SJK (C) Kulai 1, Kulai
 SJK (C) Kulai 2, Kulai
 SJK (C) Kulai Besar, Kulai
 SJK (C) Kuo Kuang, Skudai
 SJK (C) Kuo Kuang 2, Skudai
 SJK (C) Labis, Segamat
 SJK (C) Ladang Pengkalan Bukit, Panchor, Muar
 SJK (C) Lam Lee
 SJK (C) Layang-Layang, Kluang
 SJK (C) Lee Ming, Pontian
 SJK (C) Lenga, Muar
 SJK (C) Li Chi, Segamat
 SJK (C) Li Chun, Batu Pahat
 SJK (C) Lit Terk, Niyor, Kluang
 SJK (C) Lok York, Pontian
 SJK (C) Lok Yu 1, Pontian
 SJK (C) Lok Yu 2, Pontian
 SJK (C) Lok Yu 3, Pontian
 SJK (C) Lok Yu 4, Pontian
 SJK (C) Lok Yu 6, Pontian
 SJK (C) Macap, Simpang Renggam
 SJK (C) Malayan, Batu Pahat
 SJK (C) Masai
 SJK (C) Mawai, Kota Tinggi
 SJK (C) Ming Chih, Batu Pahat
 SJK (C) Ming Terk, Johor Bahru
 SJK (C) Nam Heng Baru, Masai
 SJK (C) Nan Hwa, Bukit Kangkar, Muar
 SJK (C) Nan Mah, Pontian
 SJK (C) Nan Ya, Telok Sengat, Kota Tinggi
 SJK (C) New Kota, Kota Tinggi
 SJK (C) Ngee Heng, Johor Bahru
 SJK (C) Pa Yai, Kg Paya
 SJK (C) Pai Chee, Mersing
 SJK (C) Pai Tze, Tangkak
 SJK (C) Paloh, Kluang
 SJK (C) Panchor, Batu Pahat
 SJK (C) Pandan
 SJK (C) Peay Min, Telok Ramunia, Kota Tinggi
 SJK (C) Pei Chai, Muar
 SJK (C) Pei Cheng, Kampung Jawa, Pengerang
 SJK (C) Pei Chiao, Pontian
 SJK (C) Pei Chih, Bukit Paloh
 SJK (C) Pei Chun, Batu Pahat
 SJK (C) Pei Chun 1, Pontian
 SJK (C) Pei Chun 2, Pontian
 SJK (C) Pei Eng, Muar
 SJK (C) Pei Hwa, Johor Bahru
 SJK (C) Pei Hwa, Pontian
[* SJK (C) Pei Hwa, Kota Tinggi]
 SJK (C) Pei Hwa, Ledang
 SJK (C) Pei Hwa, Muar
 SJK (C) Pei Yang, Muar
 SJK (C) Ping Ming, Batu Pahat
 SJK (C) Ping Ming, Kluang
 SJK (C) Ping Ming, Lima Kedai, Johor Bahru
 SJK (C) Pu Nan, Muar
 SJK (C) Pu Sze, Skudai
 SJK (C) Pui Nan, Muar
 SJK (C) Pulai, Kulai, Johor Bahru
 SJK (C) Saleng, Senai
 SJK (C) San Chai, Muar
 SJK (C) San Yu, Muar
 SJK (C) Sawit, Kulai
 SJK (C) Sayong, Renggam
 SJK (C) Sedenak, Kulai
 SJK (C) Seelong, Senai
 SJK (C) Seg Hwa
 SJK (C) Senai, Senai
 SJK (C) Sengkang, Kulai
 SJK (C) Seri Lalang, Kluang
 SJK (C) Sin Hwa, Bukit Pasir, Batu Pahat
 SJK (C) Sin Hwa, Parit Sangit, Batu Pahat
 SJK (C) Sing Hwa, Muar
 SJK (C) Siu Woon, Pontian
 SJK (C) Soon Cheng, Muar
 SJK (C) South Malaya, Simpang Renggam
 SJK (C) St. Joseph, Johor Bahru
 SJK (C) Sulong
 SJK (C) Tai Sin, Pengerang
 SJK (C) Tah Kang, Segamat
 SJK (C) Tah Tong, Pontian
 SJK (C) Tambang, Segamat
 SJK (C) Tampoi
 SJK (C) Tenang, Segamat
 SJK (C) Tiram, Ulu Tiram
 SJK (C) Thai Hong
 SJK (C) Thorburn, Layang Layang
 SJK (C) Tongkang, Batu Pahat
 SJK (C) Tua Ooh, Segamat
 SJK (C) Tuan Poon, Simpang Renggam
 SJK (C) Tung Cheng, Batu Pahat
 SJK (C) Wee Sin, Muar
 SJK (C) Woon Hwa, Kulai, Johor Bahru
 SJK (C) Yani, Batu Pahat
 SJK (C) Yeong Chang, Batu Pahat
 SJK (C) Yok Eng, Muar
 SJK (C) Yong Peng (1), Batu Pahat
 SJK (C) Yong Peng (2), Batu Pahat
 SJK (C) York Chai, Batu Pahat
 SJK (C) Yu Eng, Muar
 SJK (C) Yu Hwa, Kota Tinggi
 SJK (C) Yu Jern, Bukit Pasir, Muar
 SJK (C) Yu Ming, Kluang
 SJK (C) Yu Ming, Sanglang, Pontian
 SJK (C) Yu Ming 1, Pontian
 SJK (C) Yu Ming 2, Pontian

Tamil-type primary schools
 SJK (T) Bandar Segamat, Segamat
 SJK (T) Batu Anam, Batu Anam
 SJK (T) Bekok, Bekok
 SJK (T) Cantuman Chaah, Chaah
 SJK (T) Cep. Niyor, Kluang
 SJK (T) Desa Cemerlang, Ulu Tiram
 SJK (T) Gelang Patah, Gelang Patah
 SJK (T) Jalan Bukit Rengam, Renggam
 SJK (T) Jalan Haji Manan, Kluang
 SJK (T) Jalan Khalidi, Muar
 SJK (T) Jalan Parit Ibrahim, Pontian
 SJK (T) Jalan Setesyen Paloh, Paloh
 SJK (T) Jalan Sialang, Tangkak
 SJK (T) Jalan Tajul, Kota Tinggi
 SJK (T) Jalan Yahya Awal, Johor Bahru
 SJK (T) Kahang Batu 24, Kahang
 SJK (T) Kangkar Pulai, Johor Bahru
 SJK (T) Ladang Ban Heng, Pagoh
 SJK (T) Ladang Bekoh, Tangkak
 SJK (T) Ladang Bukit Benut, Kluang
 SJK (T) Ladang Bukit Serampang, Tangkak
 SJK (T) Ladang Elaeis, Kluang
 SJK (T) Ladang Fortrose, Gemas
 SJK (T) Ladang Gomali, Batu Anam
 SJK (T) Ladang Hock Lam, Gelang Patah
 SJK (T) Ladang Kelan, Kulai
 SJK (T) Ladang Kulai Besar, Kulai
 SJK (T) Ladang Kulai Oil Palm, Kulai
 SJK (T) Ladang Labis, Labis
 SJK (T) Ladang Lambak, Kluang
 SJK (T) Ladang Lanadron, Panchor
 SJK (T) Ladang Layang, Layang-Layang
 SJK (T) Ladang Mados, Ulu Tiram
 SJK (T) Ladang Mengkibol
 SJK (T) Ladang Mount Austin, Johor Bahru
 SJK (T) Ladang Nagappa, Jementah
 SJK (T) Ladang Nam Heng, Kota Tinggi
 SJK (T) Ladang Niyor, Kluang
 SJK (T) Ladang Nordanal, Panchor
 SJK (T) Ladang Pamol, Kluang
 SJK (T) Ladang Pasak, Kota Tinggi
 SJK (T) Ladang Pelepah, Kota Tinggi
 SJK (T) Ladang Rem, Kota Tinggi
 SJK (T) Ladang Rini, Skudai
 SJK (T) Ladang Sagil, Tangkak
 SJK (T) Ladang Sedenak, Kulai
 SJK (T) Ladang Segamat, Segamat
 SJK (T) Ladang Sembrong, Layang-Layang
 SJK (T) Ladang Simpang Rengam, Renggam
 SJK (T) Ladang Southern Malay, Renggam
 SJK (T) Ladang Sungai Muar, Segamat
 SJK (T) Ladang Sungai Papan, Kota Tinggi
 SJK (T) Ladang Sungai Plentong, Johor Bahru
 SJK (T) Ladang Sungai Senarut, Batu Anam
 SJK (T) Ladang Tanah Merah, Tangkak
 SJK (T) Ladang Tangkah, Tangkak
 SJK (T) Ladang Tebrau, Johor Bahru
 SJK (T) Ladang Teluk Sengat, Kota Tinggi
 SJK (T) Ladang Temiang Renchong, Pagoh
 SJK (T) Ladang Tong Hing, Pasir Gudang
 SJK (T) Ladang Tun Dr. Ismail, Renggam
 SJK (T) Ladang Ulu Remis, Layang-Layang
 SJK (T) Ladang Ulu Tiram, Johor Bahru
 SJK (T) Ladang Voules, Segamat
 SJK (T) Ladang Yong Peng, Yong Peng
 SJK (T) Masai, Masai
 SJK (T) Mersing, Mersing
 SJK (T) Pasir Gudang, Pasir Gudang
 SJK (T) Permas Jaya, Masai
 SJK (T) Seri Pelangi, Batu Pahat
 SJK (T) Sri Gading, Batu Pahat
 SJK (T) Taman Tun Aminah, Skudai

Religious primary schools (SABK)
Sma Shamsuddiniah Tangkak
Sma Lughatul Quran Tangkak

Special education primary schools

Secondary schools

National Daily Secondary Schools

Private schools

Chinese independent high schools
 Chinese High School, Batu Pahat
 Chong Hwa High School, Kluang
 Chong Hwa High School S.B.R.
 Chung Hwa High School, Muar
 Foon Yew High School, Johor Bahru
 Foon Yew High School, Kulai
 Foon Yew High School, Bandar seri Alam
 Pei Chun Independent High School
 Pei Hwa High School
 Yong Peng High School

International schools
 Crescendo International School, Johor Bahru, Johor
 Fairview International School, Johor
 Marlborough College Malaysia, Johor Bahru
 Raffles American School, Johor Bahru
 R.E.A.L Schools, Cahaya Campus, Johor
 Repton (formerly Excelsior) International School, Johor Bahru, Johor
 Orbix International School, Muar, Johor
 Sekolah Rendah Seri Omega, Johor Bahru
 Sekolah Menengah Seri Omega, Johor Bahru
 Shattuck-St. Mary's Forest City International School, Forest City, Gelang Patah, Johor
 Stellar International School, Puteri Harbour, Johor
 Sri Ara International School, Johor Bahru
 Sunway International School, Sunway Iskandar, Johor Bahru
 Tenby Schools Setia Eco Gardens, Iskandar Puteri Johor
 United International School, Batu Pahat, Johor

People's religious schools
 Maahad Tahfiz Al-Akhyar, Johor Bahru
 Madrasah Tahfiz Al-Iman (A), Taman Universiti, Skudai
 Sekolah Agama Parit Raja, Parit Raja, Batu Pahat
 Sekolah Rendah Islam (SRI ABIM)
 Sekolah Rendah Islam At-Tahfiz (SRIT), Pasir Gudang
 Sekolah Rendah Islam Hidayah, Johor Bahru
 Sekolah Rendah Agama Bersepadu, Batu Pahat
 Sekolah Rendah Agama Bersepadu, Johor Bahru
 Sekolah Rendah Agama Bersepadu, Kluang
 Sekolah Rendah Agama Bersepadu, Kota Tinggi
 Sekolah Rendah Agama Bersepadu, Mersing
 Sekolah Rendah Agama Bersepadu, Muar
 Sekolah Rendah Agama Bersepadu, Segamat
 Sekolah Rendah Agama Bersepadu, Pontian
 Sekolah Agama Dato Hj Abd Rahman Ahmad, Pasir Gudang

Special education private schools

Johor